Angle Tarn may refer to:
Angle Tarn (Langstrath), small lake in Cumbria, England
Angle Tarn (Patterdale), small lake in Cumbria, England

See also
Angletarn Pikes, mountain near Patterdale, Cumbria, England